The Clown (Danish: Klovnen) is a 1926 Danish silent drama film directed by A.W. Sandberg and starring Gösta Ekman, Karina Bell and Maurice de Féraudy. It is a remake of a 1917 film of the same title, also directed by Sandberg. The film's sets were designed by the art director Carlo Jacobsen.

Cast
 Gösta Ekman as Joe Higgins
 Karina Bell as Daisy
 Maurice de Féraudy as Circus director James Bunding
 Robert Schmidt as 	Marcel Phillipe
 Kate Fabian as 	Graciella
 Karen Caspersen 		
 Mathilde Nielsen 	
 Jacoba Jessen 
 Holger Pedersen 
 Eric Bertner as Pierre Beaumont
 Peter Nielsen 	
 Henry Seemann	
 Philip Bech 	
 Edmonde Guy as Lilian Delrme
 Ernst Van Duren as 	
 Sigurd Langberg as Clown
 Torben Meyer as Butler

References

Bibliography
 Thorsen, Isak. Nordisk Films Kompagni 1906-1924: The Rise and Fall of the Polar Bear. Indiana University Press, 2017.

External links

1926 films
1926 drama films
Danish drama films
Danish silent films
Danish black-and-white films
1920s Danish-language films
Films directed by A. W. Sandberg
Nordisk Film films
Remakes of Danish films
Silent drama films